Vikki Howells is a Welsh Labour politician and former teacher. Since May 2016, she has been the Member of the Senedd for Cynon Valley.

Early life and education
Howells was brought up in Cwmbach, Rhondda Cynon Taf, Wales. She was educated at St John the Baptist School, a Church in Wales secondary school in Aberdare. She studied international and Welsh history at the University of Wales, Cardiff, and graduated with a Bachelor of Arts degree. She remained at Cardiff to undertake postgraduate study in Modern Welsh History, and graduated with a Master of Arts degree.

Career

Teaching career
Before her election to the Senedd, Howells was a history teacher and the assistant head of sixth form at St Cenydd Comprehensive School in Caerphilly, South Wales.

Political career
In December 2015, it was announced that Howells had been selected as the Welsh Labour candidate for the Cynon Valley constituency of the Senedd. She has been a member of the Labour Party for over 20 years. On 5 May 2016, she was elected a Member of the Welsh Assembly for that constituency; she received 9,830 votes (51.1% of the votes cast). 

Howells chairs the Welsh Labour Group of MSs. Howells is president of the mental health charity Friends R Us and vice-president of Cwmbach Male Voice Choir. Vikki is also a member of the Cynon Valley History Society, the social justice thinktank the Bevan Foundation, the Co-operative Party, the GMB and USDAW.

References

Year of birth missing (living people)
Living people
Place of birth missing (living people)
Welsh Labour members of the Senedd
Female members of the Senedd
Wales MSs 2016–2021
Wales MSs 2021–2026
Welsh schoolteachers
People from Cynon Valley
People educated at St John the Baptist School, Aberdare
Alumni of Cardiff University